Morochata, Muruchata is a location in the Cochabamba Department in central Bolivia. It is the seat of the Morochata Municipality, the second municipal section of the Ayopaya Province.

References 

 Instituto Nacional de Estadistica de Bolivia

Populated places in Cochabamba Department